Vladimír Cibák is a retired slalom canoeist who competed for Czechoslovakia in the mid-to-late 1950s. He won three medals in the folding K1 team event at the ICF Canoe Slalom World Championships with two silvers (1957, 1959) and a bronze (1955).

References

Czechoslovak male canoeists
Possibly living people
Year of birth missing (living people)
Medalists at the ICF Canoe Slalom World Championships